Trinity Episcopal Church Complex is a historic Episcopal church complex located at the junction of Church Street and Barclay Street in Saugerties, Ulster County, New York. The church was built in 1831, and is a large one-story, Greek Revival style frame building.  A large wing was added about 1900.  The front facade features a pedimented portico with four fluted Doric order columns.  Also on the property is the "H"-shaped brick Parish Hall (c. 1875) and the -story, Dutch Revival style rectory (c. 1890).

It was added to the National Register of Historic Places in 1998.

References

Episcopal church buildings in New York (state)
Churches on the National Register of Historic Places in New York (state)
Greek Revival church buildings in New York (state)
Churches completed in 1831
19th-century Episcopal church buildings
Churches in Ulster County, New York
National Register of Historic Places in Ulster County, New York